The 2008 1000 Guineas Stakes was a horse race held at Newmarket Racecourse on Sunday 4 May 2008. It was the 195th running of the 1000 Guineas.

The winner was Stefan Friborg's Natagora, a French-bred grey filly trained at Chantilly by Pascal Bary and ridden by Christophe Lemaire. Natagora's victory was the first in the race for her owner, trainer and jockey.

The contenders
The race attracted a field of fifteen runners, ten trained in the United Kingdom, four in Ireland and one in France. The favourite was the French challenger Natagora who had been named European Champion Two-year old Filly in 2007 when she had won the Prix Robert Papin in France and the Cheveley Park Stakes in England. The Ballydoyle stable had two representatives in Kitty Matcham, the winner of the Rockfel Stakes and Savethisdanceforme, whilst the other two Irish runners were the dual Group One winner Saoirse Abu (Phoenix Stakes, Moyglare Stud Stakes) and the Curragh maiden race winner Lush Lashes, neither of whom were fancied in the betting. The leading British-trained runners appeared to be two fillies bred and owned by the Cheveley Park Stud: the Nell Gwyn Stakes winner Infallible, and Spacious, the winner of the May Hill Stakes. The most fancied of the other fillies was the John Dunlop-trained Muthabara, the undefeated winner of the Fred Darling Stakes. Natagora headed the betting at odds of 11/4 ahead of Infallible (7/2) and Spacious (11/2) with Muthabara and Kitty Matcham on 8/1.

The race
The 80/1 outsider Francesca d'Gorgio, who had been unruly in the starting stalls broke quickly and led two furlongs but was overtaken by Natagora. Most of the fillies raced up the stands side (the left of the course from the jockeys' viewpoint) with Natagora racing along the stands rail. The favourite set the pace from Muthabara with Infallible, Saoirse Abu, Lady Deauville and Laureldene Gale close behind. Natagora began to come under pressure a furlong from the finish, at which point several fillies, including Spacious, Nahoodh and Lush Lashes began to make progress. In the closing stages Natagora ran on to win by half a length from Spacious, with Saoirse Abu a further half length away in third. Infallible, Nahoodh, Lush Lashes, Royal Confidence and Muthabara came next, with less than three and a half lengths separating the first eight finishers.

Race details
 Sponsor: Stan James
 First prize: £212,888
 Surface: Turf
 Going: Good to Firm
 Distance: 8 furlongs
 Number of runners: 15
 Winner's time: 1:38.99

Full result

 Abbreviations: nse = nose; nk = neck; shd = head; hd = head; dist = distance; UR = unseated rider; DSQ = disqualified; PU = pulled up

Winner's details
Further details of the winner, Natagora
 Foaled: 18 February 2005
 Country: France
 Sire: Giant's Causeway; Dam: Sarayir (Mr Prospector)
 Owner: Stefan Friborg
 Breeder: Bertrand Gouin & Georges Duca

References

1000 Guineas
 2008
1000 Guineas
1000 Guineas
2000s in Suffolk